Ahmed Fathi Hamza (born February 2, 1988), known as Ahmed Felix, is an Egyptian professional footballer who plays as a central midfielder for the Egyptian club Al Nasr. In 2013, Felix left Petrojet in a free transfer to the promoted team to Egyptian first tier, El Raja SC, for 80k Egyptian pounds by season, and in 2017, he signed 3-year contract for Al Nasr from El Raja SC.

References

External links
Ahmed Fathi Felix at KOOORA.com

1988 births
Living people
Egyptian footballers
Association football midfielders
Petrojet SC players
El Raja SC players